Martinotti cells are small multipolar neurons with short branching dendrites.  They are scattered throughout various layers of the cerebral cortex, sending their axons up to the cortical layer I where they form axonal arborization. The arbors transgress multiple columns in layer VI and make contacts with the distal tuft dendrites of pyramidal cells. 
 Martinotti cells express somatostatin and sometimes calbindin, but not parvalbumin or vasoactive intestinal peptide. Furthermore, Martinotti cells in layer V have been shown to express the nicotinic acetylcholine receptor α2 subunit (Chrna2).

Martinotti cells are associated with a cortical dampening mechanism.

Historically, the discovery of Martinotti cells has been mistakenly attributed to Giovanni Martinotti  1888, although it is now accepted that they were actually discovered in 1889 by Carlo Martinotti (1859–1908), a student of Camillo Golgi.

External links

News, press releases 
 Rare cell prevents rampant brain activity - on the discovery of potential dampening influence of Martinotti cells.
 NIF Search - Martinotti Cell via the Neuroscience Information Framework

References 

Neurons
Cell biology